Orleans was a city in Linn County, Oregon, United States. It was established around 1850 and destroyed in the Great Flood of 1862. It was not rebuilt. The city was located across the Willamette River from Corvallis.

See also
List of ghost towns in Oregon

References 

Ghost towns in Oregon
1850 establishments in Oregon Territory
1862 disestablishments in Oregon